Swami Vivekananda, the nineteenth-century Indian Hindu monk, is considered one of the most influential people of modern India and Hinduism. Rabindranath Tagore suggested to study Vivekananda's works to learn about India. Indian independence activist Subhas Chandra Bose regarded Vivekananda as his spiritual teacher. Mahatma Gandhi said that after reading the works of Vivekananda, his love for his nation became a thousand-fold.

Barack Obama, the former President of the United States, quoted Vivekananda's words in his speech delivered in India in November 2010. Jayalalitha, the Chief Minister of Tamil Nadu said that Vivekananda inspired her to enter politics.

Vivekananda's birthday, on 12 January, is celebrated as the National Youth Day in India. In 2012, a three-day world conference was organised by the Institute of World Religions to commemorate the 150th birth anniversary of Swami Vivekananda to mark the days Vivekananda delivered his historic lectures in 1893. In 2013, Indian Railways started Vivek Express, four pairs of express trains as a tribute to Vivekananda on his 150th birth anniversary.

Influence on notable Indian people 
Vivekananda, after he became a "sanyasi of high intellect, action, and devotion" in 1886, had a deep desire to spread the message of “divine unity of existence and unity in diversity’ throughout the country. Vivekananda then as a Parivrajaka, meaning: "a wandering monk", travelled the length and breadth of the country. For nearly two years, he travelled  all over India  from north to north, and befriended many notable people and influenced them with his Advaita-Vedanta philosophy and many of them even encouraged and supported him to travel to the US to attend the Parliament of World Religions in Chicago; some of the prominent names are Ajit Singh of Khetri of Rajasthan, Dewan of Porbandar and Junagadh in Gujarat, Raja of Ramnad of Madras, K. Seshadri Iyer, Dewan of Mysore and Chamaraja Wodeyar, the Maharaja of Mysore.

Bal Gangadhar Tilak, the Indian nationalist, journalist, teacher, social reformer, lawyer and an independence activist who was the first popular leader of the Indian Independence Movement observed :”Twelve centuries ago Sankaracharya was the only great personality, who not only spoke of the purity of our religion, not only uttered in words that this religion was our strength and wealth, not only said that it was our sacred duty to preach this religion in the length and breadth of the world – but also brought all this into action. Swami Vivekananda is a person of that stature—who appeared towards the last half of the 19th century."

Rabindranath Tagore suggested "If you want to know India, study Vivekananda. In him everything is positive and nothing negative." Sri Aurobindo has said: "Vivekananda was a soul of puissance if ever there was one, a very lion among men, but the definite work he has left behind is quite incommensurate with our impression of his creative might and energy. Brahmabandhav Upadhyay told, Vivekananda and his mission encouraged him to go to England and propagate Hinduism and Vedanta there. Bal Gangadhar Tilak praised Vivekananda for taking the responsibility to re-establish the glory of Hinduism. Bipin Chandra Pal felt, Vivekananda's message was "the message of modern humanity".

On 6 February 1921, Mahatma Gandhi came to Belur Math and paid homage to Vivekananda. On this occasion he said: 
I have come here to pay my homage and respect to the revered memory of Swami Vivekananda, whose birthday is being celebrated today. I have gone through his works very thoroughly, and after having gone through them, the love that I had for my country became a thousand-fold. I ask you, young men, not to go away empty-handed without imbibing something of the spirit of the place where Swami Vivekananda lived and died.

He also told that Vivekananda's writings needed no introduction.

In 1893, during the journey from Yokohama to Canada on the ship Empress, Vivekananda accidentally met Jamsetji Tata who was also going to Chicago. During the conversation Vivekananda told Tata about the necessity of establishing a world-class scientific Institution in India and this encouraged Tata to establish the Indian Institute of Science, which gradually became one of India's best-known research university of India. Jawaharlal Nehru, the first Prime Minister of Independent India, praised Vivekananda's personality and dignity and said that his heart carried fire: "it was no empty talk he was indulging in. He was putting his heart and soul into the words he uttered." Nehru also recounted that "his generation" was widely influenced by Vivekananda.

Indian independence activist Subhas Chandra Bose considered Vivekananda as his spiritual teacher. He called Vivekananda a "full-blooded masculine personality – and a fighter to the core of being". Bose told, under the "sacred influence" of Ramakrishna and Vivekananda his own life got awakened.

Jawaharlal Nehru India's first Prime Minister was also very much inspired by Vivekananda. Nehru was influenced a great deal by the modern outlook of Vivekananda’s teachings since they blended science and spirituality.

Vinoba Bhave praised Vivekananda's contribution to make Indians' conscious of their strength and said that he showed them their shortcomings and defects and taught them to overcome these. He further mentioned that at the time of Vivekananda people of India were shrouded in tamas, ignorance and unwisdom, and failed to distinguish between weakness and non-attachment and peace. In such a situation Vivekananda brought new light, and he taught "The same Soul resides in each and all" and suggested to serve mankind considering them manifestations of God daridranarayan (meaning: "poverty stricken god").

According to Indian independence activist and social worker C. Rajagopalachari who became the first Indian Governor General of India, Vivekananda saved Hinduism and India. He stated that we owe everything to Vivekananda. The first vice-president and the second President of independent India Sarvepalli Radhakrishnan said that Vivekananda's was born in a "critical period" when the nation and her people were collapsing in "despair, frustration and hopelessness" and in such circumstances Vivekananda's teachings gave them new hope and taught them to rely on spiritual resources. Indian historian Ramesh Chandra Majumdar told, Vivekananda preached the best parts of Hinduism and Indian spirituality to the world. According to Majumdar's studies, Vivekananda's ideals added spiritual basis in the Indian nationalism. Majumdar also noted, though Vivekananda was an ascetic, his patriotism was remarkable. He said:

Though an ascetic, Vivekananda was a patriot of patriots. The thought of restoring the prehistoric glory of India by resuscitating among her people the spiritual vitality which was dormant, but not dead, was always the uppermost though in his mind...

Pranab Mukherjee, the President of India, suggested in a speech delivered on 31 May 2013 at the Convocation Hall, University of Mumbai, Mumbai, to remember the call of Vivekananda to reconstruct India's national character. He also told :—
 Swamiji unhesitatingly appreciated the positive aspects and accomplishments of the Western Societies – and refrained from being dogmatic as he made his point, he was able to build a robust new bridge of understanding and goodwill for India. In so doing, he also opened a new dialogue between our peoples based on mutual acceptance.

Narendra Modi, the Prime minister of India, is an ardent admirer of Vivekananda. In April 2013, he visited Belur Math and meditated at the room of Vivekananda. Jayalalithaa, the Chief Minister of Tamil Nadu told, Vivekananda inspired her to enter politics. She said:

 She further said that there are "some people who made public life a profession. The profession can be transformed into service, but service cannot be turned into a profession. As far as I am concerned, Swami Vivekananda was a great inspiration for me to enter politics. When I took the first step into politics in 1982, I mentioned Swami Vivekananda in an interview."

Mamata Banerjee, the Chief Minister of West Bengal was inspired by Vivekananda's writings which she said helped her in the difficult times of her political career. Banerjee stated:

In the course of the several movements that I led, there would be moments of doubt. There were some who were critical of me and even I wondered that there were so many people who had pinned their hopes on me. What if I were to fail them? I would read books written by Swami Vivekananda to gather my strength.

In 2013, Yoga guru Ramdev told he feels Vivekananda spread "India's cultural message" to the world.

Social activist Anna Hazare was motivated by the works of Swami Vivekananda and took inspiration for all the social work he did from Swami Vivekananda only.

Arvind Kejriwal read about Swami Vivekananda during his IIT days and was very much inspired from him.

Influence on non-Indian people 
Vivekananda, during and after his tour of western countries in Europe and the United States had profound influence on notable personalities, who either became his ardent devotees or friends and some even his ardent disciples and many of whom even became ascetics. Right at the beginning of his visit to Chicago to address the Parliament of World Religions Professor John Henry Wright of Harvard University, invited him to speak at Harvard. He pointed out to Vivekananda the necessity of going to the Parliament of Religions, which he thought would give an introduction to the nation. Wright's reasoning was "To ask for your credentials is like asking the sun to state its right to shine in the heavens". Some of such well-known luminaries are: Max Müller (Indologist), J. J. Goodwin, John Henry Barrows, Mark Twain, Sturdy, Romain Rolland,
Sara Chapman Bull, his American mother and benefactor, Mary Hale, Josephine MacLeod, Christine Greenstidel (who later came to be known as Sister Christine), Maragaret Noble (Sister Nivedita in later years), William James, Josiah Royce, Robert G. Ingersoll, Nikola Tesla, Lord Kelvin, Harriet Monroe, Ella Wheeler Wilcox, Sarah Bernhardt, Emma Calvé and Hermann Ludwig Ferdinand von Helmholtz  He initiated several followers : Marie Louise (a French woman) became Swami Abhayananda, and Leon Landsberg became Swami Kripananda,

American industrialist John D. Rockefeller reportedly made his first large donation for public welfare and later became a notable philanthropist after a meeting with Vivekananda. Vivekananda succinctly explained to Rockfeller that his philanthropy would only be a channel to help the poor and distressed people.

Vivekananda influenced French Opera singer Emma Calvé, who wrote in her autobiography:

It has been my good fortune and my joy to know a man who truly "walked with God," a noble being, a saint, a philosopher, and a true friend. His influence upon my spiritual life was profound. He opened up new horizons before me, enlarging and vivifying my religious ideas and ideals, teaching me a broader understanding of truth. My soul will bear him an eternal gratitude.

Vivekananda's life and works have influenced many scholars, writers, politicians worldwide. French writer Romain Rolland wrote that Vivekananda was "energy personified". Rolland felt "kingliness" was Vivekananda's characteristics, "He was a born king and nobody ever came near him in India or America without paying homage to his majesty." American writer, historian, philosopher Will Durant told, the speeches of Vivekananda were more "virile" than the ones delivered in the Vedic times.

The nationalist leader and the first president of independent Indonesia Sukarno said that it was Swami Vivekananda who inspired him to become strong and to serve God and mankind. Historian and Indologist Arthur Llewellyn Basham compared Vivekananda with other eminent religious figures of India such as Kabir, Adi Shankara, Chaitanya. Russian academician and public figure Eugene Chelyshev was an ardent admirer of Swami Vivekananda. He said:
Reading and re-reading the works of Vivekananda each time I find in them something new that helps deeper to understand India, its philosophy, the way of the life and customs of the people in the past and the present, their dreams of the future...
Chelyshev also predicted that the memory of Vivekananda will never fade away. Chinese scholar Huan Xin Chuan stated that Vivekananda was the most renowned social figure of modern China and Chinese socialists carefully study the works of Vivekananda.

Barack Obama, the President of the United States, quoted Vivekananda's words in his speech delivered in India in November 2010. He said:

Instead of succumbing to division, you have shown that the strength of India—the very idea of India—is its embrace of all colors, castes and creeds. It's the diversity represented in this chamber today. It's the richness of faiths celebrated by a visitor to my hometown of Chicago more than a century ago—the renowned Swami Vivekananda. He said that, "holiness, purity and charity are not the exclusive possessions of any church in the world, and that every system has produced men and women of the most exalted character."

Notable memorials and observations

National Youth Day 

Swami Vivekananda's birthday, i.e. 12 January, is celebrated as the National Youth Day in India. On 17 October 1984, the Indian Government officially declared the birthdate of Vivekananda as the National Youth Day, which was to be celebrated 1985 onwards. The circular stated: "it was felt that the philosophy of Swamiji and the ideals for which he lived and worked could be a great source of inspiration for the Indian Youth."

Universal Brotherhood Day 
The "Universal Brotherhood Day" is observed on 11 September, on the day when Vivekananda delivered his first speech at the Parliament of the World's Religions Chicago in 1893 and addressed the American people and his audience as "Sisters and brothers of America".

150th birth anniversary of Swami Vivekananda 
The 150th birth anniversary of Swami Vivekananda was celebrated in India and abroad during 2013. The Ministry of Youth Affairs and Sports in India officially made an official declaration in this regard. Year-long events and programs have been organised by branches of the Ramakrishna Math, the Ramakrishna Mission, the central and state governments in India, educational institutions and youth groups. Bengali film director Tutu (Utpal) Sinha made a film, The Light: Swami Vivekananda, and Indian American Bengali animator and laserist Manick Sorcar created a laser show, Swamiji, as a tribute for his 150th birth anniversary.

Swami Vivekananda delivered his famous lectures at the Parliament of the World's Religions, Chicago in 1893. In 2012, a 3-day World conference was organised by the Institute of World Religions (of the Washington Kali Temple), Burtonsville, Maryland, in association with the Council for Parliament of World Religions, Chicago, Illinois to commemorate the 150th birth anniversary of Swami Vivekananda.

Posts of India and Sri Lanka issued several commemorative stamps of Vivekananda in 2013. Vivekananda was also featured on other stamps of India in 1963, 1993 and 2015 and of Sri Lanka in 1997. In 2018, India and Serbia issued joint stamps devoted to Vivekananda.

Vivek Express 
In 2011—2013 Railway Budget, Indian Railways announced four pairs of new express trains on the Indian Railways network. These new trains were started as a tribute to Vivekananda on his 140th birth anniversary.

Public Notice 3 
To mark the anniversary of Swami Vivekananda's landmark address at the Chicago Art Institute, and in remembrance of the terrorist attacks at the World Trade Center and the Pentagon 108 years later on that very date, 11 September, Indian artist Jitish Kallat created Public Notice 3, a site-specific installation on the Art Institute's Woman's Board Grand Staircase.

On 28 January 2012, the Art Institute of Chicago, in conjunction with the Republic of India, reinstalled a plaque commemorating Vivekananda's landmark speech outside Fullerton Hall.

In popular culture

Films 
Bengali
Swami Vivekananda has been the primary topic of many films, dramas ad folk-plays. Bengali film director Amar Mullick made two different movies: Swamiji (1949) and its adaptation in Hindi, Swami Vivekananda (1955). The film Swami Vivekananda (1955) is considered a "faithful and memorable documentation feature" on Vivekananda.

The Swami Vivekananda was released on 12 June 1998. The film was premiered on India's public service broadcaster Doordarshan on 15 August 1998 as a part of Doordarshan's celebration of 50th year of India's Independence. The film has been appreciated for blending the role of "eccentric middle-aged mystic, nominally a Brahmin priest, claiming nothing short of godhood role “of Paramahmsa very well with that of the“ young non-Brahmin agnostic modernist role" of Vivekananda.

In 2013, Utpal (Tutu) Sinha directed The Light: Swami Vivekananda which was a tribute to Vivekananda on his 150th anniversary of his birth.  Indian American animator and laserist Manick Sorcar created a laser show, Swamiji, in honor of the anniversary.

Birieswar Vivekananda is a 1964 Indian Bengali-language film directed by Modhu Bose, starring Amaresh Das in the titular role. Indian filmmaker Bimal Roy made a documentary about Vivekananda,  titled Life and Message of Swami Vivekananda, in the same year.

Sound of Joy, an Indian 3D-animated short film directed by Sukankan Roy depicts the spiritual journey of Vivekananda. It won the National Film Award for Best Non-Feature Animation Film in 2014.

Dramas 
Bengali theatre group Lokkrishti staged a drama Biley to commemorate the birth anniversary. Bengali theatre actor Debshankar Haldar played the role of Swami Vivekananda in this drama. In 2013 Belgharia Shankhamala theatre group staged the drama Bireswar. The drama was written by Basab Dasgupta and directed by Debesh Chattopadhyay.

References

Bibliography 
 
 
 
 
 
 
 
 
 

Swami Vivekananda
Hinduism in India
Vivekananda
Neo-Vedanta